Javier Estebán Sanguinetti  (born 8 January 1971 in Lomas de Zamora) is an Argentine football manager and former player. He is the current manager of Banfield.

A defender, Sanguinetti played the majority of his career for Banfield.

Career
Sanguinetti made his debut for Banfield on 6 April 1991 in a 2nd division game against Deportivo Morón. He was part of the squad that won the 2nd division title in 1992-1993, securing promotion to the Primera División.

Sanguinetti joined Racing Club for the 1993-1994 season, but returned to Banfield the following season. Banfield were relegated from the Primera in 1997, but Sanguinetti stayed with the club, eventually helping them to secure promotion back to the primera in 2001.

Sanguinetti holds a number of club records for Banfield, including the highest number of appearances in the Primera Division (over 300) and the highest total number of appearances for the club (over 450).

In May 2008, Sanguinetti announced he would retire at the end of the 2007-08 season, his last game came against River Plate, where he left the field to an ovation from both sets of fans after suffering an injury in the early part of the game.

Titles

References

External links
 Soy de Banfield profile
 
 Javier Sanguinetti at Footballdatabase
 

1971 births
Living people
People from Lomas de Zamora
Argentine footballers
Association football defenders
Club Atlético Banfield footballers
Racing Club de Avellaneda footballers
Argentine Primera División players
Club Atlético Banfield managers
Sportspeople from Buenos Aires Province
Club Sol de América managers
Newell's Old Boys managers
Sportivo Luqueño managers